Trachys is a genus of Asian plants in the grass family.

 Species
 Trachys copeana Kabeer & V.J.Nair - Tamil Nadu
 Trachys muricata (L.) Pers. ex Trin. - India, Myanmar, Sri Lanka

References

Panicoideae
Poaceae genera